The Otis Cary House is a historic house in Foxboro, Massachusetts.  It is a -story wood-frame house, five bays wide, with a side-gable roof, twin end chimneys, and a central entrance with flanking sidelights.  It was built in 1837 by Otis Cary, a leading businessman and politician in the town.  Cary owned the foundry on Mill Street, and was active in town and state politics.  Cary's grandson, the noted educator Frank Boyden, was born in this house.

The house was listed on the National Register of Historic Places in 1986.  It is now home to Bright Start Child Care.

See also
National Register of Historic Places listings in Norfolk County, Massachusetts

References

Houses in Norfolk County, Massachusetts
Buildings and structures in Foxborough, Massachusetts
Houses on the National Register of Historic Places in Norfolk County, Massachusetts
Houses completed in 1837
Greek Revival houses in Massachusetts
Birthplaces of individual people